Symbolophorus veranyi is a species of fish in the family Myctophidae.

References 

Myctophidae
Fish described in 1888